The Grigorovich MUR-1, (MUR - Morskoi Uchebnyi Rhône - seaplane trainer Rhône), was a trainer flying boat built in the Soviet Union in the mid-1920s.

Development
The MUR-1 was developed by the Grigorovich Design Bureau in response to a Red Air Force requirement for a flying boat suited to training naval pilots. The MUR-1 differed from the Grigorovich M-5 in that it used a more powerful engine, single bay wings with thicker section, and stronger tail structure. Speed was increased, but other characteristics suffered. Increased weight of the tail structure necessitated carrying  of ballast in the nose. Test flights of the MUR-1 showed no discernable improvement over the M-5.

To remedy aerodynamics deficiencies during its initial flight trials, the MUR-1 was modified with pressure sensors and a new hull, and redesignated MUR-2, with input from TsAGI engineer N.N.Podsevalov. Test flights were conducted 1929-1931 with the intent to test load condition during taxi, takeoff and landing.

Specifications

Notes

Further reading
 

1920s Soviet patrol aircraft
Flying boats
High-wing aircraft
Aircraft first flown in 1926
Rotary-engined aircraft